Rear-Admiral Sir Richard Spry (1715– 25 November 1775) was a Royal Navy officer who served as Commander-in-Chief, North American Station.

Naval career
After an education at Truro Grammar School Spry joined the Royal Navy as a volunteer in 1733. Following the sinking of his ship by the Spanish Navy he was taken prisoner in 1745 but released two months later.

He took part in the siege of Pondicherry in India in 1750.

From 17 October 1753 to 5 June 1754 he was captain of the frigate .

In 1755 he became senior officer at Halifax, Nova Scotia, and in 1758 took part in the successful Siege of Louisbourg. In 1762 he was appointed Commander-in-Chief, North American Station. In 1766 he was promoted to the rank of Commodore and appointed Commander-in-Chief, Mediterranean Station.

Spry returned to England in 1769. In 1770 he was promoted to rear admiral and went on to be Port Admiral at Plymouth in 1771.

Spry was knighted at Portsmouth on 24 June 1773 and retired to Place House in St Anthony in Roseland, Cornwall. He died there in 1775. His memorial in St Anthony's Church there is by Humphrey Hopper.

References

Bibliography

1715 births
1775 deaths
Royal Navy rear admirals
People educated at Truro Cathedral School